Przemysław Norko (born 29 March 1979) is a Polish professional football goalkeeper. He played for Poland at Under-21 level. He currently plays for Arkonia Szczecin.
  
Norko was born in Szczecin and began his career in his native Poland with Chemik Police before joining Zagłębie Lubin. He made his 1st Division debut on 23 August 1997, coming on as a substitute in a 3-1 defeat away to Widzew Łódź. He played six more times before being sent off in the 4-1 win away to Pogoń Szczecin on 25 October 1997. he played just once more that season, appearing in the 2-0 defeat away to Legia Warsaw on 9 June 1998. He played twice the following season, in the August games against ŁKS Łódź and Górnik Zabrze before leaving to join Odra Szczecin.

He subsequently played for Polar Wrocław and Górnik Polkowice before returning to Zagłębie in 2001. However, he played just once, in a 3-0 cup defeat away to Górnik Łęczna on 10 October 2001.

In 2002, he moved to Pogoń Szczecin, playing nine league games and once in the cup before leaving to join Ruch Wysokie Mazowieckie. He then moved to Greek 2nd Division side Akratitos in 2004. In 2005, he moved to Albanian side Partizani Tirana, before returning to Poland with Ruch Chorzów. However, he was unable to play for Chorzow due to a lack of international clearance from the Albanian Football Association.

In January 2007 he joined Torquay United, initially on a one-month contract, the first of a number of cheap foreign imports promised by new Torquay chairman Chris Roberts. However, a delay with his international clearance prevented him making his debut in the FA Cup against Southampton. There was later a problem with his medical and the contract was cancelled.

He returned to Poland to play for Kania Gostyń, joining Pogoń Szczecin in March 2008. He subsequently joined Arkonia Szczecin.

References

External Source
 

1979 births
Sportspeople from Szczecin
Living people
Polish footballers
Ruch Chorzów players
Pogoń Szczecin players
Zagłębie Lubin players
FK Partizani Tirana players
Kania Gostyń players
Polish expatriate footballers
Expatriate footballers in Albania
Association football goalkeepers